Saint Vincent and the Grenadines competed at the 2022 Commonwealth Games in Birmingham, England between 28 July and 8 August 2022. It was the team's thirteenth appearance at the Games.

On 8 July 2022, a team of 21 athletes (12 men and 9 women) competing in five sports was named. Shane Cadogan and Mikeisha Welcome were the country's flagbearers during the opening ceremony.

Competitors
The following is the list of number of competitors participating at the Games per sport/discipline.

Athletics

A squad of six athletes was confirmed as of 8 July 2022.

Men
Track and road events

Women
Field events

Cycling

One cyclist was selected as of 8 July 2022.

Road
Men

Squash

A squad of four players (three men, one woman) was selected on 24 April 2022.

Singles

Doubles

Swimming

A squad of six swimmers was confirmed as of 8 July 2022.

Men

Women

Table tennis

Saint Vincent and the Grenadines qualified for the women's team event via the ITTF World Team Rankings (as of 2 January 2020). Four players were selected as of 8 July 2022.

Doubles

Team

References

Nations at the 2022 Commonwealth Games
Saint Vincent and the Grenadines at the Commonwealth Games
2022 in Saint Vincent and the Grenadines